Nongoma Local Municipality is a local municipality in the northeastern part of Zululand in the KwaZulu-Natal province of South Africa.  It is Zululand’s second largest municipality in terms of population and the second largest in terms of area.  It shares its name with the town of Nongoma, which serves as the seat of the municipality.  It is the home of King Goodwill Zwelethini, the hereditary traditional leader of the Zulu nation, and his royal palaces are among the main tourist attractions in the region.

Nongoma is predominantly a rural municipality.  It encompasses 363 settlements, only one of which (Nongoma) has some urban characteristics.  98.34% of the population lives in rural areas.  The level of education is low. Only 33% of the population have a primary education; only 5.3% have an education to Grade 12.

Infrastructure and facilities
The Nongoma Local Municipality has one hospital and twelve clinics/health facilities. There is one full-fledged police station, one social development office facility, one full-fledged post office, one library, and two sports facilities.  There are about 25 community primary schools, 13 high schools, and one Further Education and Training (FET) college active in the area.

Only 12% of the community have access to electricity. The remaining 88% meet their energy needs using hydrocarbon (coal, gas, and paraffin) and/or biomass (wood, cow-dung, and crop waste). The task of  collecting these have severe social and health costs which accrue primarily to rural women and children.

A radial network of roads converges in Nongoma Local Municipality.  The rural roads are generally in poor condition and are often inaccessible during the rainy season.  Although there are 12 clinics that serve  the three tribal authority areas, a number of people still do not have access to these clinics due to poor road conditions and limited access to roads. In some areas there are no clinics and thus the people are deprived of basic health care. The situation contributes to the poor health conditions in the municipality.

Almost 56% of Nongoma's communities have no access to a telephone network. Only 1% of the municipality's households have a telephone in their actual dwelling.

There is an airstrip at eBukhalini that services the flight needs of the region. The airstrip is mainly used by specialist surgeons who visit the local Benedictine Hospital on a regular basis. The local business community and the king of the Zulu nation also use the airstrip.

Natural environment
The rugged mountainous terrain and the contrasting grass lands of Nongoma provide a scenic quality.  However, the environment in Nongoma is currently in a state of degradation.  Overgrazing and incorrect cultivation methods have led to erosion and the degradation of field quality.  Important river systems are the Ivuna River, Black Mfolozi River and Mona River.  Water pollution is a common problem in the area as the people use the rivers for all purposes, including washing clothes, animal feed, human consumption and other purposes. In many areas the rivers and streams are the only water source available to the communities.

Politics 

The municipal council consists of forty-five members elected by mixed-member proportional representation. Twenty-three councillors are elected by first-past-the-post voting in twenty-three wards, while the remaining twenty-two are chosen from party lists so that the total number of party representatives is proportional to the number of votes received. In the election of 1 November 2021  the Inkatha Freedom Party (IFP) lost its majority, winning a plurality of twenty-one seats on the council.
The following table shows the results of the election.

Main places
The 2001 census divided the municipality into the following main places:

References

External links
 Official website

Local municipalities of the Zululand District Municipality